Ernest William Swanton may refer to:

E. W. Swanton (1907–2000), English journalist
Ernest William Swanton (mycologist) (1870–1958), English biologist